Painted glass refers to two different techniques of decorating glass, both more precisely known by other terms.  

Firstly, and more correctly, it means enamelled glass, normally relatively small vessels which have been painted with preparations of vitreous enamel, and then fixed by a light firing to melt them and fuse them to the glass surface.  

Secondly it refers to stained glass, used for windows. Here the design is made up using sheets of coloured glass, cut to shape and held in place by lead. The painting is the final stage, typically only in black.  The paint is usually not fused to the flat glass by firing, but if it is, it is still called "stained glass".

Glass painting or glass painter might refer to either technique, but more usually enamelled glass.  It may also refer to the cinematic technique of matte painting.

Notes

References
Osborne, Harold (ed), The Oxford Companion to the Decorative Arts, 1975, OUP, 

Glass production
History of glass
Glass art